Caladenia nivalis, commonly known as the exotic spider orchid or crystalline spider orchid, is a species of orchid endemic to the south-west of Western Australia. This orchid is easily distinguished by its bright white to pale pink and red flowers and its narrow range in and near the Leeuwin-Naturaliste National Park.

Description 
The sepals have thick, brown, club-like glandular tips. Flowering occurs from late August to October.

Taxonomy and naming 
Caladenia nivalis was first described in 2001 by Stephen Hopper and Andrew Phillip Brown and the description was published in Nuytsia. The specific epithet (nivalis) is a Latin word meaning "snowy" or "of snow" referring to the bright white flowers of this species.

Distribution and habitat 
The exotic spider orchid occurs between Cape Naturaliste and Moses Rock in the Jarrah Forest and Warren biogeographic regions where it grows in peppermint woodland, coastal heath and in granite crevices.

Conservation
Caladenia nivalis is classified as "not threatened" by the Western Australian Government Department of Parks and Wildlife.

References 

nivalis
Orchids of Western Australia
Endemic orchids of Australia
Plants described in 2001
Endemic flora of Western Australia
Taxa named by Stephen Hopper
Taxa named by Andrew Phillip Brown